Lake Powell is an artificial reservoir on the Colorado River in Utah and Arizona, United States. It is a major vacation destination visited by approximately two million people every year. It is the second largest artificial reservoir by maximum water capacity in the United States behind Lake Mead, storing  of water when full. However, Lake Mead has fallen below Lake Powell in size several times during the 21st century in terms of volume of water, depth and surface area.

Lake Powell was created by the flooding of Glen Canyon by the Glen Canyon Dam, which also led to the 1972 creation of Glen Canyon National Recreation Area, a popular summer destination of public land managed by the National Park Service. The reservoir is named for John Wesley Powell, a civil war veteran who explored the river via three wooden boats in 1869. It primarily lies in parts of Garfield, Kane, and San Juan counties in southern Utah, with a small portion in Coconino County in northern Arizona. The northern limits of the lake extend at least as far as the Hite Crossing Bridge.

Lake Powell is a water storage facility for the Upper Basin states of the Colorado River Compact (Colorado, Utah, Wyoming and New Mexico).

According to US Geological Survey and the Bureau of Reclamation report - In addition to water loss, Lake Powell faced an average annual loss in storage capacity of about 33,270 acre-feet, or 11 billion gallons, per year between 1963 and 2018 because of sediments flowing in from the Colorado and San Juan rivers, according to the report. Those sediments settle at the bottom of the reservoir and decrease the total amount of water the reservoir can hold.

History

Planning
In the 1940s and early 1950s, the United States Bureau of Reclamation planned to construct a series of Colorado River dams in the rugged Colorado Plateau province of Colorado, Utah, and Arizona. Glen Canyon Dam was born of a controversial damsite the Bureau selected in Echo Park, in what is now Dinosaur National Monument in Colorado. A small but politically effective group of objectors, led by David Brower of the Sierra Club, succeeded in defeating the Bureau's bid, citing Echo Park's natural and scenic qualities as too valuable to submerge.

Glen Canyon Dam was built to solve the downstream delivery obligations of the Upper Basin states.  Lake Powell is an "aquatic bank" built to fulfill the terms of the "Compact Calls" of Lower Basin.

Construction

Construction on Glen Canyon Dam began with a demolition blast keyed by the push of a button by President Dwight D. Eisenhower at his desk in the Oval Office on October 1, 1956. The first blast started clearing tunnels for water diversion. On February 11, 1959, water was diverted through the tunnels so dam construction could begin. Later that year, the bridge was completed, allowing trucks to deliver equipment and materials for the dam and also for the new town of Page, Arizona.

Concrete placement started around the clock on June 17, 1960. The last bucket of concrete was poured on September 13, 1963. Over 5 million cubic yards (4,000,000 m³) of concrete make up Glen Canyon Dam. The dam is 710 feet (216 m) high and the surface elevation of the water at full-pool is approximately 3700 feet (1100 m). Construction of the dam cost $155 million, and 18 people died in the process. From 1970 to 1980, turbines and generators were installed for hydroelectricity. On September 22, 1966, Glen Canyon Dam was dedicated by Lady Bird Johnson.

Filling and operations
Upon completion of Glen Canyon Dam on September 13, 1963, the Colorado River began to back up, no longer being diverted through the tunnels. The newly flooded Glen Canyon formed Lake Powell. Sixteen years elapsed before the lake filled to the  level on June 22, 1980. The lake level fluctuates considerably depending on the seasonal snow runoff from the Rocky Mountains. The all-time highest water level was reached on July 14, 1983, during one of the heaviest Colorado River floods in recorded history, in part influenced by a strong El Niño event.

21st century drought

Colorado River flows have been below average since 2000 as a result of the southwestern North American megadrought, leading to lower lake levels. After 2005, the lake level slowly rebounded, although it has not filled completely since then. However, water years 2012 and 2013 were, respectively, the third and fourth-lowest runoff years recorded on the Colorado River.

The Bureau of Reclamation in 2014 reduced the Lake Powell release from 8.23 to 7.48 million acre-feet, for the first time since the lake filled in 1980. This was done due to the "equalization" guideline which stipulates that an approximately equal amount of water must be retained in both Lake Powell and Lake Mead, in order to preserve hydro-power generation capacity at both lakes. This resulted in Lake Mead declining to the lowest level on record since the 1930s.

This marks the lowest water level for Lake Powell since it was filled in 1963.

The capacity of Lake Powell has decreased by 7% since 1963 facing an average annual loss of 33,270 acre-feet of storage, due to the inflow of sediments from Colorado and San Juan rivers.

Climate 
These data are for the Wahweap climate station on Lake Powell just south of the Utah-Arizona border (Years 1961 to 2012).

Geology
Glen Canyon was carved by differential erosion from the Colorado River over an estimated 5 million years.  The Colorado Plateau, through which the canyon cuts, arose some 11 million years ago.  Within that plateau lie layers of rock from over 300 million years ago to the relatively recent volcanic activity. Pennsylvanian and Permian formations can be seen in Cataract Canyon and San Juan Canyon. The Moenkopi Formation, which dates from 230 million years ago (Triassic Period), and the Chinle Formation are found at Lees Ferry and the Rincon.  Both formations are the result of the ancient inland sea that covered the area.  Once the sea drained, windblown sand invaded the area, creating what is known as Wingate Sandstone.

The more recent (Jurassic Period) formations include Kayenta Sandstone, which produces the trademark blue-black "desert varnish" that streaks down many walls of the canyons.  Above this is Navajo Sandstone.  Many of the arches, including Rainbow Bridge, lie at this transition point.  This period also includes light yellow Entrada Sandstone, and the dark brown, almost purple Carmel Formation.  These latter two can be seen on the tops of mesas around Wahweap, and the crown of Castle Rock and Tower Butte.  Above these layers lie the sandstone, conglomerate and shale of the Straight Cliffs Formation that underlies the Kaiparowits Plateau and San Rafael Swell to the north of the lake.

The confluences of the Escalante, Dirty Devil and San Juan rivers with the Colorado lie within Lake Powell.  The slower flow of the San Juan river has produced goosenecks where  of river are contained within  on a straight line.

Landmarks and features
The lake's main body stretches up Glen Canyon, but has also filled many (over 90) side canyons.  The lake also stretches up the Escalante River and San Juan River where they merge into the main Colorado River.  This provides access to many natural geographic points of interest as well as some remnants of the Anasazi culture.
 Glen Canyon Dam, the dam the blocks the Colorado River and forms Lake Powell. (Arizona)
 Rainbow Bridge, one of the world's largest natural bridges. (Utah)
 Hite Crossing Bridge, the only bridge spanning Lake Powell.
 Defiance House ruin (Anasazi)
 Castle Rock
 Cathedral in the Desert
 San Juan goosenecks
 Gregory Butte
 Gunsight Butte
 Lone Rock
 Alstrom Point
 Kaiparowits Plateau
 Hole-in-the-Rock crossing
 the Rincon
 Three-Roof Ruin
 Padre Bay
 Waterpocket Fold
 Antelope Island lies mostly in Arizona just north of Page in the southwest part of Lake Powell.

Images

Development

Access to the lake is limited to developed marinas because most of the lake is surrounded by steep sandstone walls:
 Lee's Ferry
 Page and Wahweap Marina
 Antelope Point Marina
 Halls Crossing, Utah Marina
 Bullfrog Marina
 Hite Marina

The following marinas are accessible only by boat:
 Dangling Rope Marina
 Rainbow Bridge National Monument
 Escalante Subdistrict

Glen Canyon National Recreation Area draws more than two million visitors annually. Recreational activities include boating, fishing, waterskiing, jet-skiing, and hiking. Prepared campgrounds can be found at each marina, but many visitors choose to rent a houseboat or bring their own camping equipment, find a secluded spot somewhere in the canyons, and make their own camp (there are no restrictions on where visitors can stay).

The Castle Rock Cut is one of the most important navigational channels in the lake; it was blasted as early as the 1970s to allow boaters to bypass the winding canyons between the Glen Canyon Dam and reaches of Lake Powell further upstream – saving, on average, one hour of travel time. The cut has been deepened several times since then, to allow the use of the channel during droughts. During the protracted 21st-century drought, however, the lake has dropped so quickly on several occasions that the cut dried up during the summer tourist season, most recently in 2013. Continued deepening of the Castle Rock cut has been criticized for its high cost, but boaters and the National Park Service argue that it improves safety, saves millions of dollars in fuel, and improves emergency response time. In September 2021 the level of Lake Powell was 45 feet below the bottom of the Castle Rock cut.

Currently, most Marinas on the lake don't have Automatic Identification System monitoring stations that transmit boat positions to the AIS websites for the boating community. A substantial number of vessels on the lake do not have AIS transponders as there currently are no mandatory requirements for AIS usage for this body of water. Extra precautions must be taken with respect to boating safety, as the fractal nature of the lake's hydrologic surface area can allow vessels with limited charting equipment to become easily lost.

The burying of human (and pet) waste in Glen Canyon National Recreation Area is prohibited. Anyone who camps farther than a quarter of a mile from a marina must bring a portable toilet. Pet waste must also be packed out.

The southwestern end of Lake Powell in Arizona can be accessed via U.S. Route 89 and State Route 98. State Route 95 and State Route 276 lead to the northeastern end of the lake in Utah.

Fish species
Some of these fish species are on the US Endangered Species List. Currently most native species on the Colorado River Basin are subject to ongoing restoration efforts of some kind.

Bass
 Smallmouth bass
 Largemouth bass
 Striped bass

Carp, pike and others
 Crappie
 Sunfish
 Channel catfish
 Northern pike
 Walleye
 Common carp
 Razorback sucker
 Brown trout
 Bonytail chub
 Gizzard shad

Invasive species 

Zebra and quagga mussels first appeared in the United States in the 1980s.

The mussels were initially brought to the United States through the ballast water of ships entering the Great Lakes. These aquatic invaders soon spread to many bodies of water in the Eastern United States and have even made their way to the western United States. In January 2008, Zebra mussels have been detected in several reservoirs along the Colorado River system such as Lakes Mead, Mojave, and Havasu.

By the early 2000s Arizona, California, Nebraska, Kansas, Colorado, Nevada and Utah have all confirmed the presence of larval zebra mussels in lakes and reservoirs.

Zebra and quagga mussels can be destructive to an ecosystem due to competition for resources with native species. The filtration of zooplankton by the mussels can negatively impact the feeding for some species of fish. Zebra and quagga mussels can attach to hard surfaces and build layers on underwater structures. The mussels are known to clog pipes including those in hydroelectric power systems, thus becoming a costly and time-consuming problem for water managers in the West.

Control policies have recently been introduced to alleviate the hydroelectric problems as well as ecological problems faced by Western infestation. Beginning in 1999 Lake Powell began to visually monitor for the mussels.

In 2001 hot water boat decontamination sites were established at Wahweap, Bullfrog, and Halls Crossing marinas. In January 2007, zebra mussels were detected in Lake Mead and new action plans were announced to prevent the spread of mussels to Lake Powell.  In August 2007, preliminary testing was positive for zebra or quagga larvae in Lake Powell. These tests were deemed false positives, but adult quagga mussels were found in 2013.

In August 2010, Lake Powell was declared mussel free. Lake Powell introduced a mandatory boat inspection for each watercraft entering the reservoir beginning in June 2009.  Effective June 29, 2009, every vessel entering Lake Powell must have a mussel certificate, although boat owners were allowed to self-certify. These measures were intended to help prevent vessels from transporting Zebra mussels into Lake Powell.

Despite these measures, quagga mussel DNA was detected in 2012 and live mussels were found at a number of sites including the Wahweap Marina in Spring and Summer 2013. In June 2013 the NPS was attempting a diver-based eradication program to find and remove mussels before the lake became infested.

Pipeline proposal

References

Bibliography
 Martin, Russell, A Story That Stands Like a Dam: Glen Canyon and the Struggle for the Soul of the West, Henry Holt & Co, 1989
 McPhee, John, "Encounters with the Archdruid,"  Farrar, Straus, and Giroux, 1971
 Nichols, Tad, Glen Canyon: Images of a Lost World, Santa Fe: Museum of New Mexico Press, 2000
 Abbey, Edward, Desert Solitaire, Ballantine Books, 1985
 
 Farmer, Jared, Glen Canyon Dammed: Inventing Lake Powell and the Canyon Country, Tucson: The University of Arizona Press, 1999
 Stiles, Jim, The Brief but Wonderful Return of Cathedral in the Desert, Salt Lake Tribune, June 7, 2005

External links

 Water Level in Lake Powell, slide show of ten years of images from NASA's Landsat 5 satellite, showing dramatic fluctuations in water levels in Lake Powell.
 Lake Powell Water Database – water level, basin snowpack, and other statistics
 Lake Powell Resorts and Marinas
 Friends of Lake Powell – organization opposed to decommissioning Glen Canyon Dam
 Glen Canyon National Recreation Area (National Park Service)
 
 Data visualization from Bureau of Reclamation (interactive)
 Reclamation Information Sharing Environment (RISE) – Bureau of Reclamation database, with locations and time series on water levels and flows
 Lake Powell historical water level data - Lake Powell water level data for the recent 25-year period 1997–2022, in machine-readable (CSV/Excel) formats

 
Powell
Powell
Landmarks in Arizona
Colorado River
Powell
Tourist attractions in Coconino County, Arizona
Powell
Powell
Powell
Buildings and structures in Garfield County, Utah
Buildings and structures in Kane County, Utah
Buildings and structures in San Juan County, Utah
Powell
Glen Canyon National Recreation Area
Tourist attractions in San Juan County, Utah
Colorado River Storage Project
1963 establishments in Utah
1963 establishments in Arizona